Çalköy may refer to:

 Çalköy, Alaca
 Çalköy, Gümüşhacıköy, Amasya Province, Turkey
 Çalköy, Kargı
 Çalköy, Vezirköprü, Samsun Province, Turkey
 Çalköy, Yenice